M. K. Kunjol is Indian social worker from Kerala who was awarded Padma Shri Award by President of India for social service in 2020. They staged protests demanding the transfer of a police officer for 382 days in the 1970s.  He was also honored with the Ambedkar Award in 2001.

References

Indian social workers
1937 births
Living people
People from Kerala
Recipients of the Padma Shri in social work